The University of Bucharest, commonly known after its abbreviation UB in Romania, is a public university founded in its current form on  by a decree of Prince Alexandru Ioan Cuza to convert the former Princely Academy into the current University of Bucharest, making one of the oldest modern Romanian universities. It is one of the five members of the Universitaria Consortium (the group of elite Romanian universities).

The University of Bucharest offers study programmes in Romanian and English and is classified as an advanced research and education university by the Ministry of Education. In the 2012 QS World University Rankings, it was included in the top 700 universities of the world, together with three other Romanian universities.

History

The University of Bucharest was founded by the Decree no. 765 of 4 July 1864 by Alexandru Ioan Cuza and is a leading academic centre and a significant point of reference in society.

The University of Bucharest is rich in history and has been actively contributing to the development and modernization of Romanian education, science, and culture since 1694. In 1694 Constantin Brâncoveanu, ruler of Wallachia, had founded the Princely Academy in Bucharest with lectures delivered in Greek. In 1776, Alexander Ypsilantis, ruler of Wallachia, reformed the curriculum of the Princely Academy, where courses of French, Italian, and Latin were now taught. After 1821, the Princely Academy was continued by the Saint Sava College. In 1857, Carol Davila and Nicolae Crețulescu created the National School of Medicine and Pharmacy. In 1859, the Faculty of Law was created.

In 1857, the foundation stone of the University Palace in Bucharest was laid.

On 4/16 July 1864, Prince Alexandru Ioan Cuza established the University of Bucharest, bringing together the Faculties of Law, Sciences and Letters as one single body. In 1869, the Faculty of Medicine is created through the transformation of the National School of Medicine and Pharmacy. In the following years, new faculties were created:  1884 – the Faculty of Theology; 1906 – the Institute of Geology; 1913 – the Academic Institute for Electrotechnology; 1921 – the Faculty of Veterinary Medicine; 1923 – the Faculty of Pharmacy, 1924 – the Mina Minovici Institute of Forensic Medicine.

In 1956, student leaders, mainly from this university, planned a peaceful protest against Romania's Communist regime but were forcibly prevented from carrying it out. (See Bucharest student movement of 1956).

For a while (in the 1950s and early 1960s), it was called the "C. I. Parhon University", after Constantin Ion Parhon.

Most of the building is still intact, however during the bombardments of Bucharest in 1944, the central corpus of the building was heavily damaged and demolished due to Luftwaffe bombs, and was only re-constructed in 1969–1971. Other sections were also completed by 1980.

The area around the old University building (the University Square), adjacent to the C. A. Rosetti, Roman, Kogălniceanu, and Union squares was the scene of many riots, protests and clashes with the security forces during the Romanian Revolution of 1989. During the months of April–June 1990, the University of Bucharest was the centre of anti-communist protests.

In 1996, Emil Constantinescu, the then rector of the University of Bucharest, was elected President of Romania, after defeating Ion Iliescu in the 1996 Romanian presidential election.

Organisation

Faculties

The University of Bucharest has 19 faculties, covering various fields such as natural sciences, humanities, social sciences, and theology:
 The Faculty of Business and Administration
 The Faculty of Biology
 The Faculty of Chemistry
 The Faculty of Law
 The Faculty of Philosophy
 The Faculty of Physics
 The Faculty of Geography
 The Faculty of Geology and Geophysics
 The Faculty of History
 The Faculty of Journalism and Communication Studies
 The Faculty of Foreign Languages and Literatures
 The Faculty of Letters
 The Faculty of Mathematics and Computer Science
 The Faculty of Psychology and Education Sciences
 The Faculty of Sociology and Social Work
 The Faculty of Political Science
 The Faculty of Orthodox Theology
 The Faculty of Roman Catholic Theology
 The Faculty of Baptist Theology

Academic & Research Units

The university has the following five interdisciplinary departments:
 Technology Department
 Distance Learning Department
 UNESCO Department for intercultural and interreligious exchanges
 Department of Education Pedagogy
 Francophone Doctoral School of Social Sciences

The university also has a publishing house, different research institutes and research groups (such as the Institute for Political Research, the Institute for Mathematics, 
the Center for Byzantine Studies, the Vasile Pârvan Archeology Seminary, the Center for Nuclear Research, etc.), master and doctorate programmes, and a number of lifelong learning facilities and programmes. It has partnership agreements with over 50 universities in 40 countries, and participates in European programmes such as ERASMUS, Lingua, Naric, Leonardo da Vinci, UNICA, AMOS, TEMPUS, TEMPRA. It is an accredited Cisco Academy, has Microsoft curriculum, and is accredited by Red Hat for its academic programme.

Campus

The University of Bucharest has a number of buildings throughout Bucharest, so in that respect it does not have a single campus. Its two main buildings are:
 The Old Building, in the University Square (practically right in the center of the city), housing the Faculties of Mathematics and Computer Science, History, Chemistry, Geography, Letters and the Department of Romance Languages and Literatures.
 The Kogălniceanu Building, near the Opera House, housing the Administrative section and the Faculty of Law.

Other faculties have their own buildings and research facilities, scattered throughout the city, such as:
 The Departments of Germanic, Slavic and Oriental Languages and Literatures, on Pitar Moş Street.
 The Faculty of Biology, on Splaiul Independenței.
 The Faculty of Philosophy, on Splaiul Independenței.
 The Faculty of Psychology, on Șoseaua Panduri.
 The Faculty of Political Science, on Sfântu Ştefan Street.
 The Faculty of Orthodox Theology, on Bibescu Voda Street, near Unirii Square.
 The Faculty of Roman Catholic Theology, on General Berthelot Street.
 The Faculty of Baptist Theology, on Berzei Street.
The university prints an annual guide for freshmen.

Rankings

In the 2012 QS World University Rankings, the University of Bucharest was included in the Top 601-701 universities of the world, together with three other Romanian universities, including Babeș-Bolyai University in Cluj-Napoca, and Alexandru Ioan Cuza University in Iași.

The University of Bucharest has been awarded the 2000 National Academic Excellence Diploma, and the 2004 National Academic Excellence Medal. All of the degrees and diplomas awarded by the university are internationally recognised.

Affiliations
The University of Bucharest is a member of numerous international organisations and partnerships, including:

 The Association of Universities in European Capitals (UNICA)
 The Network of South-East European Universities
 The European University Association (EUA)
 Agence Universitaire de la Francophonie (AUF)
 Black Sea Universities Network (BSUN)
 Academic Cooperation Association (ACA)
 European Inter-University Centre for Human Rights and Democratization (EIUC)
 Eurasian Universities Union (EURAS)
 SEE GRID - South-East Europe GRID - 2005
 Central European Exchange Program for University Studies (CEEPUS)
 ERASMUS NETWORK EUE-NET
 Educational Structure in Europe, Phase IV (TUNING)
 European Physics Education Network (EUPEN)
 Stakeholders Tune European Physics Studies (STEPS)

As part of the on-going ERASMUS programme, the University of Bucharest has approximately 225 Erasmus agreements with European partner universities.

Academic staff, alumni, and rectors

Past and present faculty
 Ion Barbu, also known as Dan Barbilian – mathematician and poet
 Grigore Brâncuș - linguist
 Silviu Brucan – political analyst and author
 George Călinescu – writer and literary critic
 Mircea Cărtărescu – Postmodern writer
 Emil Constantinescu – 3rd President of Romania
 Petru Creția – philologist
 Neagu Djuvara – historian
 Alexandru Graur – linguist
 Aristide Halanay – mathematician
 Spiru Haret – mathematician, astronomer and politician
 Eugène Ionesco – Romanian-French playwright widely considered the most important of the 20th century
 Iorgu Iordan – linguist
 Nicolae Iorga – historian, literary critic, and politician
 Traian Lalescu – mathematician
 Gabriel Liiceanu – philosopher
 Titu Maiorescu – literary critic
 Nicolae Manolescu – author and literary critic
 Solomon Marcus – mathematician
 Adrian Năstase – politician
 Miron Nicolescu – mathematician
 Bogdan Petriceicu Hasdeu – writer and philologist
 Dimitrie Pompeiu – mathematician
 Alexandru Rosetti – linguist
 Ion Th. Simionescu – geologist
 Simion Stoilow – mathematician
 Nicolae Titulescu – politician
 Tudor Vianu – literary critic, philosopher
 Dan-Virgil Voiculescu – mathematician
 Gheorghe Vrânceanu – mathematician

Alumni
 Albert-László Barabási – physicist
 Nineta Barbulescu – career diplomat, ambassador
 Ismat Beg – mathematician
 Gheorghe I. Cantacuzino – archeologist
 Hristu Cândroveanu – editor, literary critic and writer
 Mircea Cărtărescu – postmodern writer
 Zoia Ceaușescu – mathematician, daughter of Nicolae Ceaușescu
 Emil Cioran – essayist and philosopher
  – mathematician
 Iosif Constantin Drăgan – businessman, writer, and historian
 Mircea Eliade – historian of religion, fiction writer, philosopher, and professor at the University of Chicago
 Nicholas Georgescu-Roegen – economist
 Viviana Gradinaru – Professor of Neuroscience at Caltech
 Eugen Filotti – diplomat
 Horia Hulubei – physicist
 Grigore Iunian – politician
 Traian Lalescu – mathematician
 Gheorghe Mihoc – mathematician
 Grigore Moisil – mathematician and computer scientist
 Miron Nicolescu – mathematician
 Constantin Noe – editor and professor
 Ștefan Odobleja – scientist, one of the precursors of cybernetics
 Octav Onicescu – mathematician
 George Emil Palade – cell biologist, 1974 Nobel Prize laureate
 Nicolae Paulescu – Romanian physiologist, professor of medicine, missed the Nobel Prize 1923 for discovering insulin
 Eleni Papadopulos-Eleopulos – nuclear physicist and AIDS denialist
 Andrei Pleșu – philosopher, essayist, journalist, literary and art critic, and politician
 Dorin N. Poenaru – nuclear physicist
 Valentin Poénaru – mathematician
 Victor Ponta – former Prime Minister of Romania
 Constantin Rădulescu-Motru – psychologist and sociologist
 Mihail Sadoveanu – writer
 Ahmad Maher Abul Samen – Jordanian Minister of Public Works and Housing and Minister of Transport
 Nicolae Saramandu – linguist and philologist
 George Simion – politician and activist
 Horia Sima – leader of the Iron Guard and co-leader of the National Legionary State
 Ruxandra Sireteanu – neuroscientist
 Bogdan Suceavă – mathematician and writer
 Gheorghe Tașcă – economist
 Șerban Țițeica – physicist
 Radu Vasile – politician and poet
 Dan-Virgil Voiculescu – mathematician

Rectors
 Gheorghe Costaforu (1864–1871)
 Vasile Boerescu (1871)
 Ioan Zalomit (1871–1885)
 Alexandru Orăscu (1885–1892)
 Titu Maiorescu (1892–1897)
 Grigoriu Ștefănescu (1897–1898)
 Constantin Dimitrescu-Iași (1898–1911)
 Ermil Pangrati (1911–1912)
 Ioan Bogdan (1912)
 Thoma Ionescu (1912–1915)
 Ioan Athanasiu (1915–1920)
 Mihail Vlădescu (1920–1923)
 Ermil Pangrati (1923–1929)
 Nicolae Iorga (1929–1932)
 Nicolae Gheorghiu (1932–1936)
 Constantin C. Stoicescu (1936–1940)
 Petre P. Panaitescu (1940–1941)
 Alexandru Otetelișanu (1941)
 Horia Hulubei (1941–1944)
 Daniel Danielopolu (1944)
 Simion Stoilow (1944–1946)
 Alexandru Rosetti (1946–1949)
 Ilie G. Murgulescu (1949–1950)
 Constantin Balmuș (1950–1952)
 Avram Bunaciu (1952–1954)
 Nicolae Sălăgeanu (1954–1957)
 Iorgu Iordan (1957–1958)
 Jean Livescu (1959–1963)
 Gheorghe Mihoc (1963–1968)
 Jean Livescu (1968–1972)
 George Ciucu (1972–1981)
 Ioan-Ioviț Popescu (1981–1988)
 Ion Dodu Bălan (1989)
 Nicolaie D. Cristescu (1990–1992)
 Emil Constantinescu (1992–1996)
 Ioan Mihăilescu (1996–2005)
 Ioan Pânzaru (2005–2012)
 Mircea Dumitru (2012–2019)
 Marian Preda (2019–Present)

See also 
 List of modern universities in Europe (1801–1945)

References

External links

Official website 

 
Educational institutions established in 1864
1864 establishments in Romania